Fowey is a town and civil parish in Cornwall, England. 

Fowey may also refer to:

 River Fowey, Cornwall, England
 Fowey railway station, Fowey, Cornwall, a former station
 , various Royal Navy ships
 Fowey (1798 ship), an armed cutter hired by the Royal Navy (1798–1800), later a privateer